PYOSA is a Mexican multi-national industrial family-owned group Founded by Rafael Fernández Saldana and his sons Alberto Fernández Ruiloba and lately participating Rafael and Jorge Fernández Ruiloba, fully based on the chemical industry. Within their products and services include paints, inks, plastics, textiles, petroleum products, car batteries, TV CRTs, fragrances, pharmaceuticals, detergents, and more. 
The group has several plants in Monterrey’s metropolitan area, where it manufactures and commercializes a wide range of products for its customers around the world. Additionally, the company has commercial offices in Mexico City and Guadalajara, for clients located in the Mexican central and south regions. The company also has office links in different parts of the world including United States, Brazil, China, Japan, Italy and Germany.

See also
List of Mexican Companies
Mauricio Fernández Garza

External links
Pyosa
Fernández Ruiloba

Manufacturing companies based in Monterrey
Mexican companies established in 1938
Privately held companies of Mexico
Mexican brands
Manufacturing companies established in 1938